The American Academy of Arts is an independent, non-profit film school located in Escondido, California.  It specializes in visual and digital media arts education and is staffed by working Hollywood and independent film professionals.  As part of its program it conducts a 9-day Indie Filmmaker's Bootcamp which using digital film equipment teaches how to make a film from conception to marketing and its distribution.

Art schools in California
Education in Escondido, California
Private universities and colleges in California